Ennice is an unincorporated community in Alleghany County, North Carolina, United States. Ennice has a post office with ZIP code 28623, which opened on March 6, 1888.

References

External links
 Ennice Community Website

Unincorporated communities in Alleghany County, North Carolina
Unincorporated communities in North Carolina